Semalea arela, the Arela dart, Arela skipper or brown silky skipper, is a butterfly in the family Hesperiidae. It is found in Senegal, Guinea, Sierra Leone, Liberia, Ivory Coast, Ghana, Nigeria, Cameroon, the Republic of the Congo, the Central African Republic, the Democratic Republic of the Congo, Uganda, Kenya, Tanzania, Malawi, northern Zambia, Mozambique and eastern Zimbabwe. The habitat consists of forests.

Adults are on wing year round.

The larvae feed on Zingiber, Aframomum, Pennisetum, Setaria and Panicum species.

References

Butterflies described in 1891
Erionotini
Butterflies of Africa